Lanark is an unincorporated community in Raleigh County, West Virginia, United States. Lanark has a post office with ZIP code 25860.

The community was named after Lanark, in Scotland.

References

Unincorporated communities in Raleigh County, West Virginia
Unincorporated communities in West Virginia
Coal towns in West Virginia